Sholing Football Club is an English football club based in Sholing, Southampton, Hampshire. Formerly known as Vosper Thorneycroft FC and later VTFC the club changed its name in 2010 to Sholing FC. In  2013–14 they won both the FA Vase and the Wessex League Premier Division and have three times been runners up in the Wessex Premier, in 2007, 2009 and 2016. The club has twice won the Hampshire League, in 2001 and 2004. Sholing are also 8 times Southampton Senior Cup Winners.

History

Vosper Thornycroft FC 
Vosper Thorneycroft were formed in 1960 as a successor to Thornycroft's (Woolston F.C.), which had folded eight years earlier, although teams from the Woolston Works had competed as early as 1878 under various names. During one remarkable season in 1920, they held Burnley to a 0–0 draw in the FA Cup, losing the replay 5–0.

In its post 1960 incarnation they initially played in the Southampton Junior League. After a number of successful years, they were promoted to the Hampshire League Third Division in 1991, rising to the Second Division the following season, followed by the First Division in 1998. A year later they were relegated when the league was re-organised, but at their first attempt they won promotion to the new Premier Division.

In 2003 Vospers were renamed as VT FC, after their parent company, and in their first season under their new name they were Hampshire League champions and won promotion to the Wessex League.
After winning the Wessex League Cup in 2005, VTFC were league runners-up in 2008 and 2009. VTFC arrived in the Southern League Division One South and West for the 2009–10 season when they finished 4th. They lost in the subsequent play-offs to Frome Town and were also runners-up in the Southern League Cup, losing on penalties to Cambridge City.

Sholing F.C. 

In June 2010 the club changed its name to Sholing F.C. as the parent company VT Group no longer existed. The change also reflected the district of Southampton in which the club is based.

After four years in the Southern League Division One South and West, where they finished runners-up in 2011 and reached the play-offs in all four of those campaigns, the club resigned from the Southern League in 2013 for financial reasons and stepped back into the Wessex League Premier Division.

During the 2013–14 season Sholing won the FA Vase for the first time in their history, beating West Auckland Town in the final at Wembley Stadium, with Marvin McLean scoring the only goal in the game in the 71st minute.

They also finished as champions of the Wessex League Premier Division and secured promotion back to the Southern League for 2014–15.

Three players retired after the Wembley final and three more moved to other clubs in higher leagues, so 2014–15 was going to be a transition season. The club finished 17th and reached the final of the Hampshire Senior Cup, losing 3–0 to Gosport Borough. At the end of the season it was revealed that the club's ground did not meet the new FA Step 4 grading criteria and once again Sholing were placed in the Wessex League for 2015–16.

Sholing finished as runners-up to Salisbury in the Wessex League Premier Division 2015–16. The Boatmen won 10 of their last 11 games to pip Blackfield & Andover to second place. Dan Mason finished as club top scorer with 39 goals, placing him second in the League golden boot competition.

The Boatmen achieved two cup wins in the space of 3 days at the end of the 2016–17 season, firstly winning the Wessex League Cup, beating Baffins Milton Rovers 2–1, then lifting the Southampton Senior Cup with a 3–1 victory over Team Solent at St Mary's Stadium. In the Wessex Premier Division, they finished 3rd.

Sholing, once again, finished in 3rd place in the Wessex Premier Division in 2017–18 season. Despite the runners up, Andover Town, declining promotion, Sholing's Points Per Game (PPG) was less than other clubs in Step 5, so the club was not offered promotion by the FA.  The following season, however, the club won the Wessex League championship.  During the course of the season, manager Dave Diaper reached the milestone of 1000 games in charge of the team.

The Boatmen currently play in the Southern League Division One South, finishing in 7th place in 2021-22

Ground
Sholing play their home games at The Imperial Homes Stadium, Portsmouth Road. The ground has covered seating for 150 supporters and a covered terrace for another 100. There is hard standing around the length of the pitch. A new clubhouse was opened on 8 December 2019 by former Southampton and England striker James Beattie.  A new changing room facility was opened for the start of the 2020-21 season

Current squad

Honours
 FA Vase:
Winners: 2013–14
Southern League Division One South & West
Runners-up: 2010–11
Wessex League Premier Division
Champions: 2013–14, 2018–19
Runners-up: 2007–08, 2008–09, 2015–16
Hampshire Premier League
Champions: 2000–01, 2003–04
Wessex League Cup:
Winners: 2004–05, 2016–17
 Hampshire Senior Cup
Runners-up: 2008–09, 2010–11, 2014–15
 Southampton Senior Cup
Winners: 2001–02, 2003–04, 2005–06, 2006–07, 2007–08, 2009–10, 2013–14, 2016-17
Russell Cotes Cup (Hampshire FA Benevolent Cup)
Winners: 2019-20, 2020-21

Club records
Best League performance: Southern League Division One South and West 2nd, 2010–11
Best FA Cup performance: 4th Qualifying Round, 2020–21
Best FA Trophy performance: 1st Round, 2019–20
Best FA Vase performance: Winners, 2013–14

References

External links
Official website

Football clubs in Hampshire
Wessex Football League
Association football clubs established in 1960
Southern Football League clubs
1960 establishments in England
Sport in Southampton
Football clubs in England
Works association football teams in England